Voljavča is a Serbian Orthodox monastery situated in a dense forest near the Voljavča creek on the northeastern slope of the Rudnik, near the village of Stragari in central Serbia. The monastery church, dedicated to saints Michael and Gabriel, was an endowment of Mihailo Končinović, a nobleman of Despot Stefan Lazarević (r. 1402–27), reconstructed at the beginning of the 15th century on the ruins of an older church dating to 1050.

The monastery is of great historical importance due to its role during the First Serbian Uprising, when the Upspring leader, Karađorđe often hid there. In the residential part of the monastery, built in 1765. was held the first meeting of the Serbian Minister Council, first executive governing organ in the History of modern Serbia.

Notable people
Hadži-Ruvim

References

Sources

15th-century Serbian Orthodox church buildings
Medieval Serbian Orthodox monasteries
Serbian Orthodox monasteries in Serbia
Kragujevac
Cultural Monuments of Great Importance (Serbia)